is a passenger railway station in located in the city of Shima,  Mie Prefecture, Japan, operated by the private railway operator Kintetsu Railway.

Lines
Shima-Isobe Station is served by the Shima Line, and is located 57.5 rail kilometers from the terminus of the line at Ise-Nakagawa Station.

Station layout
The station was consists of a single island platform and a single island platform serving three tracks, connected to an elevated station building by footbridges. However, Platform 3 is a deadhead platform, and is not used for passenger embarkation/disembarkation.

Platforms

Adjacent stations

History
The line was one of six private companies consolidated into Mie Kotsu by order of the Japanese government on February 11, 1944. When Mie Kotsu dissolved on February 1, 1964, the station became part of the Mie Electric Railway, which was then acquired by Kintetsu on April 1, 1965. The station was rebuilt and renamed to its present name on March 1, 1970.

Passenger statistics
In fiscal 2019, the station was used by an average of 482 passengers daily (boarding passengers only).

Surrounding area
Isobe Post Office
Shima High School

See also
List of railway stations in Japan

References

External links

Kintetsu: Shima-Isobe Station  

}

Railway stations in Japan opened in 1929
Railway stations in Mie Prefecture
Stations of Kintetsu Railway
Shima, Mie